The S22 is a former regional railway service of the Zürich S-Bahn on the ZVV (Zürich transportation network). It connected the cantons of Zürich and Schaffhausen, Switzerland, with the state of Baden-Württemberg, Germany. At the end of 2015, the service was shortened from Bülach to Jestetten and the line no longer fell under the purview of ZVV, but continued to be operated by THURBO. Later S22 got replaced by a S-Bahn line from the Schaffhausen S-Bahn. The service from Schaffhausen to Singen was taken over by Deutsche Bahn (and in December 2022 by SBB GmbH, respectively), and the section between Bülach and Schaffhausen is now covered by ZVV service S9.

Route 
The line ran from Bülach, in the canton of Zürich, via Schaffhausen, canton of Schaffhausen, to Singen (Hohentwiel) in Germany. It served the following stations:
 Bülach
 Glattfelden
 Eglisau
 Hüntwangen-Wil
 Rafz
 Swiss-German border
 Lottstetten
 Jestetten
 Altenburg Rheinau (until 12 December 2010)
 Swiss-German border
 Neuhausen
 Schaffhausen
 Herblingen
 Thayngen
 Swiss-German border
 Bietingen
 Gottmadingen
 Singen (Hohentwiel)

Rolling stock 
All services were operated by THURBO Stadler GTW trains.

See also 

 Rail transport in Switzerland
 Trams in Zürich

References

External links 

 ZVV official website: Routes & zones

Former Zürich S-Bahn lines